Muhammad Khan (born 14 August 1934) is a Pakistani athlete. He competed in the men's triple jump at the 1960 Summer Olympics.

References

1934 births
Living people
Athletes (track and field) at the 1960 Summer Olympics
Pakistani male triple jumpers
Olympic athletes of Pakistan
Place of birth missing (living people)